The Unholy Four (Italian: Ciakmull (L'uomo della vendetta), lit. "Ciakmull (The vengeful man)"), also known as Chuck Moll, is a 1970 Italian Spaghetti Western. The film represents the directorial debut of Enzo Barboni, who was, until then, a respected cinematographer. He replaced Ferdinando Baldi, who was fired by the producer Manolo Bolognini because of his insistence in wanting to engage the actress Annabella Incontrera in the role of Sheila.

Plot
When a violent gang robs a bank, they also commit arson because the diversion eases their getaway. While the local prison is burning, four of its inmates profit from the general turmoil too. Among the four escapees is Chuck Moll, a young man suffering with amnesia, who only remembers about his previous life that he has been home in the town Oxaca. For lack of a better idea all the fugitives go there. It shows that Moll is not forgotten in Oxaca. Lion Udo, the father of one of the bankrobbers, recognises Moll. He, whose clan has a feud with Moll's family, takes advantage of his condition by turning him against his own kin. Before this plan works out, Moll is warned on time by one of his fellow fugitives. Moll contacts his half-brother Alan and his father John Caldwell. Only then he learns what caused his amnesia and why he'd ended up in prison. It was Alan who once mistreated Moll and ran a scheme to put him away. He hates Moll since he knows that he is not the son of John Caldwell, but the child of a rapist.

Cast 
 Leonard Mann as Chuck Moll
 Woody Strode as Woody
 Peter Martell as Silver
 Helmuth Schneider as Joe Caldwell
 George Eastman as Hondo
 Ida Galli as Sheila 
 Alain Naya as Alan Caldwell
 Dino Strano as Sam
 Andrea Aureli as Santiago
 Enzo Fiermonte as Sheriff
 Giuseppe Lauricella as Udo
 Romano Puppo as Burt
 Lucio Rosato as Tom Udo
 Luciano Rossi as Fair Poker Player
 Giovanni Cianfriglia as Saloon Brawler
 Claudio Scarchilli as Saloon Brawler

Releases
Wild East Productions released this on a limited edition DVD in 2007 with The Forgotten Pistolero.

References

External links

 

1970 films
Spaghetti Western films
1970 Western (genre) films
Films scored by Riz Ortolani
1970 directorial debut films
Films about amnesia
1970s Italian films